Quercus glauca (syn. Cyclobalanopsis glauca), commonly called ring-cupped oak or Japanese blue oak, is a tree in the beech family (Fagaceae). It is native to eastern and southern Asia, where it is found in Afghanistan, Bhutan, China, northern and eastern India, southern Japan, Kashmir, Korea, Myanmar, Nepal, and Vietnam. It is placed in subgenus Cerris, section Cyclobalanopsis.

Description
Quercus glauca is a small to medium-sized evergreen broadleaf tree growing to 15–20 m tall. The leaves are a distinct deep purple-crimson on new growth, soon turning glossy green above, glaucous blue-green below, 60–13 mm long and 20–50 mm broad, with a serrated margin. The flowers are catkins, and the fruit are acorns 1–1.6 cm long, with series of concentric rings on the outside of the acorn cup (it is in the "ring-cupped oak" sub-genus).

Cultivation and uses
It is planted as an ornamental tree in regions of Europe and North America with mild winters.

Its acorns are edible. When dried and ground into powder they can be mixed with cereals and used as flour. The roasted seeds can be used as a coffee substitute. The wood of Quercus glauca is a valuable fuelwood. Its leaves and stems are relished by deer.

Gallery

References

External links
 photo of herbarium specimen at Missouri Botanical Garden collected in China in 1977
 photo of herbarium specimen at Missouri Botanical Garden, collected in Myanmar (Burma) in 1961, showing rings on acorn cups
 
 

glauca
Trees of Asia
Flora of Indo-China
Trees of Vietnam
Plants described in 1784
Trees of Nepal
Trees of Korea